Satras are Ekasarana monasteries established by Mahapurush Shrimanta  Sankardev (1449-1568 AD) and his disciples Shri Shri Madhabdev, Damodardev and also their disciples and followers in Assam and adjoining areas.  The chief of a Satra is called a Satradhikar.  Generally Satras are treasure troves of cultural artifacts.

List of Satras

References

External links
 The Satras at atributetosankaradeva.org.
 SATRA CULTURE : A Brief Introduction at enajori.com.

Ekasarana Dharma
Satras
Satras
List